Jeannette Island is the easternmost island of the De Long Islands archipelago in the East Siberian Sea. Administratively it belongs to Yakutia of the Russian Federation.

Geography 
Jeannette is the second smallest island of the De Long group, being only  in length. The island surface is mainly covered by a central ice cap and firn.

Geology 
The most accessible and extensive exposure of bedrock is along the southwestern coast. 
These seacliffs expose a thick succession of Upper Cambrian volcaniclastic rocks which contain subordinate beds of tuffs and dacitic and andesitic lava flows. The volcanoclastic rocks are penetrated by mafic dikes and sills.

These sedimentary rocks consist generally of both fine- and coarse-grained volcaniclastic turbidites with thick beds of volcaniclastic breccias which can divided into four layers. The middle part of this layer exhibits slump structures and convolute bedding along with a few lava flows and layers of bright red tuff. The poorly rounded and sharp-edged pebbles forming the breccia consist mainly of andesitic volcanic rocks. The breccias consists of angular to sub-angular pebbles of volcanic rocks (andesite, dacite and occasionally basaltic andesite).

The bedding within these volcanoclastic rocks dip steeply towards the east-northeast. The bedding is deformed by similar folds accompanied by cleavage and east-dipping thrust faults with displacements of few tens of meters. The bedding is also offset by normal faults inclined to the east and intruded by northwest trending dolerite dikes.

History
It was discovered in 1881 by the Jeannette Expedition, commanded by Lieutenant Commander George W. De Long.

However, the ship entered an ice pack near Herald Island in September 1879 and became trapped. The vessel drifted several hundred miles with the ice, passing north of Wrangel Island. In May 1881 it approached Jeannette Island and Henrietta Island.

According to The Annual Report of the Secretary of the Navy, for the Year 1882, "A sled party landed, hoisted the national ensign, and took possession in the name of the United States. The excursion, led by George W. Melville, landed on June 2 or 3, constructed a cairn, and placed inside it a record of their visit.

During the Imperial Russian Arctic Ocean Hydrographic Expedition of 1910–1915 led by Boris Vilkitsky, the Vaygach approached Jeannette Island with the intention of mapping Jeannette and Henrietta Islands, but heavy ice blocked the approach. In 1916 the Russian ambassador in London issued an official notice to the effect that the Imperial government considered Henrietta, along with other Arctic islands, integral parts of the Russian Empire. This territorial claim was later maintained by the Soviet Union.

Some U.S. individuals assert American ownership of Jeannette Island, and others of the De Long group, based on the 1881 discovery. However, the United States government has not pursued De Long's claim to Jeannette Island, and recognizes it as Russian territory.

References

External links
 Anisimov, M.A., and V.E. Tumskoy, 2002, Environmental History of the Novosibirskie Islands for the last 12 ka. 32nd International Arctic Workshop, Program and Abstracts 2002. Institute of Arctic and Alpine Research, University of Colorado at Boulder, pp 23–25.
 Headland, R. K.,1994, OSTROVA DE-LONGA ('De Long Islands'), Scott Polar Research Institute, University of Cambridge, Cambridge, United Kingdom.
 Naval Historical Center, 2003, Jeannette Arctic Expedition, 1879-1881 — Overview and Selected Images. Last visited May 26, 2008.
 Schirrmeister, L., H.-W. Hubberten, V. Rachold, and V.G. Grosse, 2005, Lost world - Late Quaternary environment of periglacial Arctic shelves and coastal lowlands in NE-Siberia.  2nd International Alfred Wegener Symposium Bremerhaven, October, 30 - November 2, 2005.
Narine Khachatryan: The Mysterious Disappearance of Jeannette Island (on Google Maps) - Bellingcat 2019

De Long Islands
Islands of the East Siberian Sea
Islands of the Sakha Republic